Karl William Edmark (1924–1994) was an American cardiovascular surgeon, inventor of the DC defibrillator, and founder of the company Physio-Control.

References

American cardiac surgeons
20th-century American inventors
1942 births
1994 deaths